Nick Magnus (born 1 February 1955 in Emsworth, Hampshire, England) is a British keyboard player, songwriter, composer, arranger, engineer and producer.
He is from the progressive school of keyboard players, mostly associated with instrumental and rock music. In 1978-1989 he played, extensively toured and recorded with ex-Genesis guitarist Steve Hackett and his flautist brother, John Hackett.
He was a vital member of Steve Hackett's band, appearing, in total, on six Hackett studio albums released on Charisma Records and Lamborghini Records in 1979-1984. Magnus' contribution was especially considerable on the 1981 album Cured, which he co-produced, and on which he co-wrote (with Hackett) one song, "Funny Feeling", and also programmed the famous Linn LM-1 drum machine.

Nick Magnus studied piano from years 6-15, cathedral organ from 15-18, self-taught thereafter. He started his professional musical career in early 1976 with the symphonic rock band, The Enid. Then he spent two years with the progressive rock group Autumn. In 1987 he scored the music to the horror film Bloody New Year, which was directed by Norman J. Warren.

He has released six solo albums of his own compositions: Straight On Till Morning (1993), Inhaling Green (1999),
Hexameron (2004), Children of Another God (2010),  N'Monix (2014) and the latest Catharsis (2019). Steve Hackett played the guitar on the four latest albums.

Selected discography

With Steve Hackett
 Spectral Mornings (1979 Charisma)
 Defector (1980 Charisma)
 Cured (1981 Charisma)
 Highly Strung (1983 Charisma)
 Bay of Kings (1983 Lamborghini)
 Till We Have Faces (1984 Lamborghini)
 Time Lapse (live) (1992)
 The Unauthorised Biography (compilation) (1992)
 Guitar Noir (1993 - only on the 1997 remastered version)
 Genesis Revisited (1996 on track 3 only)
 Feedback 86 (1986 recordings) (2000 Camino)
 Live Archive 70, 80, 90s (2001)
 Genesis Revisited II (2012 Inside Out on CD2 track 10: "Camino Royale" [Hackett-Magnus])

With others
 Autumn - Oceanworld (1999 - recordings from 1977–1978)
 China Crisis - Flaunt the Imperfection (1985 Virgin Records - guesting on Grand Piano and synthesizer)
 John Warren - Burning Questions (1986; remastered 2007 Angel Air Records SJPCD217)
 John Hackett - Checking Out of London (2005 Hacktrax HTRX002)
 Pete Hicks and Nick Magnus - Flat Pack (2008 Beach Hut Records - released in January 2009)
 Magnus & Foster (with Dick Foster)- Don't Look Back (available as download)
 John Hackett & Nick Magnus - Live 2010 (2011 Magick Nuns Records MNCD1003)

Solo releases
 Straight On Till Morning (1993 Voiceprint Records VP142 CD, now deleted and unavailable)
 Inhaling Green (1999 Centaur Discs CENCD017)
 Hexameron (2004 Magick Nuns Records MNCD1001)
 Children of Another God (2010 Magick Nuns Records MNCD1002)
 N'Monix (2014 Esoteric Antenna Records)
 Catharsis (2019 Magick Nuns Records MNCD 1003)

As a producer
 Celtic Spirit - Celtic Dreams (1998 PolygramTV)
 Celtic Spirit - Lyra II (1999 Universal TV)
 Amoure - Kyrie (1999 Polymedia-Polystar)
 Gordon Reid - Painting Imperfect Pictures
 Gordon Reid - Aliens (2000 Deja Vu, DV-GRCD-001)

References 

Sketches of Hackett, the Authorised Steve Hackett Biography, by Alan Hewitt, Wymer Publishing,

External links 
 

1955 births
Living people
English keyboardists
English songwriters
People from Emsworth